The 1931 Humboldt State Lumberjacks football team represented Humboldt State College during the 1931 college football season. They competed as an independent.

The 1931 Lumberjacks were led by fifth-year head coach Fred Telonicher. They played home games at Albee Stadium in Eureka, California. After the debacle of the previous season (winless, and being outscored 7–268), the 1931 season was a step back for the team. They eliminated several teams from their schedule and added back in a high school team. This proved a positive, as Humboldt State finished with a record of one win, two losses and one tie (1–2–1). The Lumberjacks outscored their opponents 48–42 for the season.

Schedule

Notes

References

Humboldt State
Humboldt State Lumberjacks football seasons
Humboldt State Lumberjacks football